Bad Zurzach railway station is a railway station in the Swiss canton of Aargau and municipality of Bad Zurzach. The station is located on the Winterthur to Koblenz line of Swiss Federal Railways.

Services
 the following services stop at Bad Zurzach:

References

External links
 
 

Railway stations in the canton of Aargau
Swiss Federal Railways stations